Kalateh-ye Ahan (also Romanized as Kalāteh-ye Āhan) is a village in Jagharq Rural District, Torqabeh District, Torqabeh and Shandiz County, Razavi Khorasan Province, Iran. At the 2006 census, its population was 277, in 67 families.

References 

Populated places in Torqabeh and Shandiz County